Foxcore is a 1990s rock music genre of bands featuring female singers. According to Joanne Gottlieb and Gayle Wald, the term was coined as a joke by Thurston Moore during the early 1990s to describe a wave of loud and aggressive female fronted bands that was occurring at the time. Failing to understand Moore's humorous intent, and confusing it with the Riot Grrrl movement of that era, the media picked up on the term.

The term was criticized by Courtney Love in a 1991 interview for CKUT Radio for being sexist and tokenizing.

List of Foxcore acts
 4 Non Blondes
 7 Year Bitch 
 Babes in Toyland
 Cake Like 
 Creamers
 Dickless
 The Donnas 
 Free Kitten
 The Gits
 Hole/Courtney Love
 L7
 Lunachicks
 Luscious Jackson
 Mudwimin
 The Muffs
 The Murmurs 
 Picasso Trigger 
 Red Aunts
 Stone Fox
 STP
 Sugarsmack 
 Teen Angels 
 That Dog 
 Veruca Salt 
 Zuzu's Petals

See also
Grunge
List of riot grrrl bands
Riot grrrl

References

Hardcore punk genres